Bad Soden-Salmunster station is the station of the town of Bad Soden-Salmünster on the Kinzig Valley Railway in the German state of Hesse. The station is classified by Deutsche Bahn (DB) as a category 5 station.

History

The station was opened on 1 July 1868 along with the Wächtersbach–Steinau an der Straße section of the Kinzig Valley Railway. The Kinzig Valley Railway was part of the Frankfurt–Bebra railway, initiated by the Electorate of Hesse, the Grand Duchy of Hesse and Free City of Frankfurt and completed by Prussia. It was originally called Salmunster until 1880, when it was changed to Salmünster-Soden (until 1914) and then Salmünster-Bad Soden (until 1971).

The entrance building is listed as a monument under the Hessian Heritage Act.

Operations

The station has a "house" platform (next to the entrance building) and an island platform. The house platform (platform 1) and track 2 are exclusively used by the hourly Regional-Express services on the Frankfurt–Hanau–Wächtersbach–Fulda route. Track 3, which is located next to platform 2 on the island platform, is served by several regional services each day on the Frankfurt–Hanau–Wächtersbach–Bad Soden-Salmunster route.

The station is served by Regional-Express and Stadt-Express services. Intercity-Express and Intercity services pass through without stopping.

Notes

Railway stations in Hesse
Buildings and structures in Main-Kinzig-Kreis
Railway stations in Germany opened in 1868